James Stevenson (2 February 1883 – 3 March 1963) was Unionist Party (Scotland) MP for Glasgow Camlachie.

He won the seat in the National Government landslide of 1931, but lost it in 1935.

References

External links 
 

1883 births
1963 deaths
Members of the Parliament of the United Kingdom for Glasgow constituencies
UK MPs 1931–1935
Unionist Party (Scotland) MPs